Metareva endoscota is a moth of the subfamily Arctiinae. It was described by George Hampson in 1909. It is found in Peru.

References

 

Lithosiini
Moths described in 1909